The 2018 Horizon League men's basketball tournament (also known as Motor City Madness) was the postseason men's basketball tournament for the Horizon League of the 2017–18 NCAA Division I men's basketball season. It was held from March 2 through March 6, 2018 at Little Caesars Arena in Detroit. The tournament was won by No. 2 seed Wright State, who defeated No. 8 seed Cleveland State in the championship game, and received the conference's automatic berth into the NCAA tournament.

Seeds
All 10 teams participated in the tournament. The top six teams received a bye into the quarterfinals. Teams were seeded by record within the conference, with a tiebreaker system to seed teams with identical conference records.

Schedule

Bracket

References

Tournament
Horizon League men's basketball tournament
Horizon League men's basketball tournament
Horizon League men's basketball tournament
Basketball competitions in Detroit
2018 in Detroit
College sports tournaments in Michigan